Padelford is a surname. Notable people with the surname include:

Edward Padelford (1799–1870), American businessman
Frederick Morgan Padelford (1875–1942), American professor and author
Seth Padelford (1807–1878), American politician